Mailapura is a village in Marnal panchayat, Shorapur taluka, Yadgir district in Karnataka state, India. The nearest railhead is in Yadgir.

Demographics 
At the 2001 census, Mailapura had 874 inhabitants, with 429 males and 445 females.

Notes

External links 
 

Villages in Yadgir district